Ceridia mira is a moth of the family Sphingidae. It is known from dry bush in eastern and northern Kenya.

The length of the forewings is 19–21 mm for males and 22–24 mm for females. It is very similar to Ceridia heuglini, but the antennae are strongly pectinated, the forewings are shorter and broader and the ground colour is more brownish (not so pink).

References

Endemic moths of Kenya
Smerinthini
Moths described in 1903
Moths of Africa